Dwayne Kenneth Lowdermilk (born January 9, 1958) is a Canadian retired ice hockey defenceman who played two games in the National Hockey League for the Washington Capitals. He was originally drafted by the New York Islanders in the 1978 NHL Entry Draft. 

Lowdermilk was born in Burnaby, British Columbia. As a youth, he played in the 1971 Quebec International Pee-Wee Hockey Tournament with a minor ice hockey team from Burnaby.

Awards
 WCHL Second All-Star Team – 1978

References

External links

Profile at hockeydraftcentral.com

1958 births
Living people
Canadian ice hockey defencemen
Fort Wayne Komets players
Fort Worth Texans players
Hershey Bears players
Sportspeople from Burnaby
New York Islanders draft picks
Kamloops Chiefs players
Langley Lords players
Seattle Breakers players
Washington Capitals players
Ice hockey people from British Columbia